Volyňka is a river in the Czech Republic in the South Bohemian Region rising on the hill called Světlá hora and flowing northeast to the city of Strakonice, where it merges with Otava River. Volyňka flows through towns such as Vimperk, Volyně, Strakonice and villages like Lčovice and Čkyně. Four ancient settlements, dated 600–500 BC, were found around the river: Věnec near Lcovice, Němětice, Libětice and Třebohostice.

References

External links
 Information at the Water Management Research Institute

Rivers of the South Bohemian Region
Bohemian Forest